Fourmile Lake is a lake in Grant County, in the U.S. state of Minnesota.

Fourmile Lake was named from its distance,  from Pomme de Terre station.

See also
List of lakes in Minnesota

References

Lakes of Minnesota
Lakes of Grant County, Minnesota